The 2002 TCU Horned Frogs football team represented Texas Christian University in the 2002 NCAA Division I-A football season. TCU finished with a 10–2 (6–2 C-USA) record.  The team was coached by Gary Patterson and played their home games at Amon G. Carter Stadium, which is located on campus in Fort Worth.

Schedule

Roster

Team players in the NFL

References

TCU
TCU Horned Frogs football seasons
Conference USA football champion seasons
Liberty Bowl champion seasons
TCU Horned Frogs football